Kitzur Shulchan Aruch (there are alternative transliterations, such as Kitsur Shulhan Arukh) may refer to:

The Kitzur Shulchan Aruch (book) by Rabbi Shlomo Ganzfried.
A similar Sephardi work entitled "Kitzur Shulchan Aruch" by Rabbi Raphael Baruch Toledano.
The "Kitzur Shulchan Aruch Mekor Hayyim" by Rabbi Hayim David HaLevi
The volumes entitled "Kitzur Shulchan Aruch" from Yalkut Yosef (based on the rulings of the Sephardi Sage and former Rishon leZion Ovadia Yosef)
The Kitzur Shulchan Aruch Sefardi by Rabbi Reuven Amar.

All these works are of the same character: they are brief guides to halacha, in the form of an abridgment and updating of Joseph Caro's Shulchan Aruch (the normative work of halacha). The word kitzur is Hebrew for shortening or abridgment.

Rabbinic legal texts and responsa